There's Someone Inside Your House is a 2021 American slasher film directed by Patrick Brice and written by Henry Gayden. It is an adaptation of the 2017 novel of the same name by Stephanie Perkins and stars Sydney Park, Théodore Pellerin, Asjha Cooper, Jesse LaTourette, and Diego Josef. The plot follows Makani Young (Park), a senior transfer student from Hawaii who finds herself in the center of gruesome murder cases in her newly acquainted town of Osborne, Nebraska.

There's Someone Inside Your House was announced in March 2018, with Shawn Levy and James Wan producing through their respective production banners Atomic Monster and 21 Laps, for Netflix. Principal photography took place the following year in Vancouver with cinematographer Jeff Cutter; additional filming concluded in August 2020. During post-production, editing was completed by Michel Aller and the musical score was composed by Zachary Dawes.

There's Someone Inside Your House premiered at Fantastic Fest on September 23, 2021, and was released on Netflix on October 6, 2021. It received mixed reviews from critics.

Plot
High school football player Jackson Pace awakes to photographs taken on the night he beat up a gay classmate, Caleb, as part of a haze. Jackson is then stabbed to death by someone wearing a mask resembling his face, and the killer then exposes the film of Caleb's assault to the entire school.

The next day at school, friends Makani, Alex, Zach, Darby, and Rodrigo let Caleb sit with them at lunch after he is shunned by the rest of the school. The school's student council president, Katie announces that there will be a memorial at a church. At the church, while Katie is setting up, someone begins playing a racist and homophobic podcast that she recorded. She is confronted by the killer, who is wearing a mask of her face, and stabbed in the confessional while attempting to call 911. The next night, Zach hosts a party while his family is out of town where everyone must share their secrets. The partygoers get high, while Rodrigo takes fentanyl, which is his real secret. Rodrigo finds a trail of pills leading to his bottle before everyone gets text messages about his addiction. As the lights go out, prompting everyone to run away, Rodrigo is pursued by the killer wearing a mask of his face, who ultimately forces him to choke on his fentanyl pills before fatally slashing his throat.

The next day, most of the school believes that Ollie, Makani's ex-boyfriend, is the murderer. Ollie takes Makani out for a drive where they share a peaceful moment together, until Makani finds a taser gun in Ollie's car and realizes that Ollie ordered a background search on her, prompting her to call an Uber back home. That night at her house, she awakens to find her front door open, her phone gone, and her living room plastered with pictures of a burn victim. The killer, now wearing a mask of Makani's face, breaks the window and tries to kill her, but her friends arrive and save her. At the hospital, Makani tells her friends her real secret: during a hazing by her varsity teammates, she and the other haze victims were tortured and forced to get drunk. In a drunken state, Makani pushed one of her friends into a bonfire, badly burning her. She says that she is now sure Ollie is the killer, and the police place him under arrest.

The next day, Skipper holds a corn maze next to the school. Darby messages Makani that Ollie has been released by his brother just as his car pulls up to the school parking lot. Makani runs inside to avoid him, and she bumps into Caleb, who is then stabbed by the killer for trying to hide his homosexuality. The killer gives Makani the knife before Ollie and Makani's friends arrive and save Caleb. Makani then realizes that the killer is headed for the corn maze.

At the corn maze, the killer sets fire to the maze with the football team inside, so Makani and her friends drive into the flames to help the football players escape. Ollie and Makani confront the killer, who kills Skipper before revealing himself to be Zach. He explains to Makani that he killed everyone because he wanted to expose everyone's secrets in revenge for the bullying he endured for being the rich son of Skipper, whom the town disliked for making billions by selling and buying farms. Zach then reveals he intends to frame Makani for his crimes, but Ollie distracts him, allowing Makani to stab Zach, mortally wounding him. Makani rebukes Zach's motives and denounces him for blaming and killing others for what's wrong when Zach himself is the real problem. Makani then kills him, saying she doesn't need to wear a mask to show Zach who he truly was.

Sometime later, Makani, Ollie, and their friends celebrate graduation with everyone in the group getting into the colleges they wanted to attend. Makani decides to reconnect with her friend from the bonfire.

Cast

Production

There's Someone Inside Your House is an adaptation of the 2017 novel of the same name by Stephanie Perkins. The project was announced in March 2018, when Deadline Hollywood revealed Netflix had partnered with Shawn Levy and James Wan to produce the film under their Atomic Monster and 21 Laps companies, respectively, with a screenplay adapted by Henry Gayden. At the time, the film was described as an amalgamation of genres, in the vein of quintessential slasher films such as Friday the 13th and Scream as well as coming-of-age dramas such as John Hughes' The Breakfast Club and George Lucas' American Graffiti. Additional producers of the film include Dan Cohen and Michael Clear.

In March 2019, it was announced that Patrick Brice would direct the film from Gayden's script. In August 2019, Sydney Park, Théodore Pellerin, Asjha Cooper, Dale Whibley, Jesse LaTourette, Burkely Duffield, Diego Josef, Zane Clifford and Sarah Dugdale joined the cast of the film. Principal photography began in Vancouver, British Columbia, Canada, on August 22, 2019, and ended on October 12, 2019. Additional photography for the film concluded on August 23, 2020. Michel Aller served as the primary editor for the film. Zachary Dawes composed the score.

Release
There's Someone Inside Your House premiered at Fantastic Fest on September 23, 2021. The film was initially expected to be released on Netflix in February 2021 but was later delayed, and in August 2021, Netflix announced that it would be released on October 6, 2021.

Reception
 On Metacritic, the film has a weighted average score of 45 out of 100, based on reviews from 12 critics, indicating "mixed or average reviews".

Jeannette Catsoulis of The New York Times wrote: "In trying to have it both ways, Brice has created a messy, overstuffed parody of moral policing that squanders the promise of its cleverly executed opening." Benjamin Lee of The Guardian gave the film 2/5 stars, writing: "Director Patrick Brice is so distracted with trying to be of the moment that he forgets to make his film base-level fun or at times even base-level coherent".

Michael Nordine of Variety wrote that the film was "more refreshing than it should be", and added: "the success of 'Someone' hinges on the fact that it ultimately embraces the future rather than clinging to the past." Matthew Jackson of Looper wrote: "While it doesn't carry the meta-textual cleverness of 'Scream,' the genre-bending zaniness of 'Freaky,' or the timeless feel of 'Halloween,' there's something instantly and tremendously appealing about 'There's Someone Inside Your House.'"

References

External links

2020s American films
2020s English-language films
2020s high school films
2020s serial killer films
2020s slasher films
2020s teen horror films
2021 films
2021 horror thriller films
20th Century Studios films
21 Laps Entertainment films
American high school films
American horror thriller films
American serial killer films
American slasher films
American teen horror films
English-language Netflix original films
Films based on American horror novels
Films directed by Patrick Brice
Films postponed due to the COVID-19 pandemic
Films set in Nebraska
Films shot in Vancouver
Films with screenplays by Henry Gayden
Home invasions in film